John Kirkby was Bishop of Carlisle, elected about 8 May 1332 and consecrated on 19 July 1332. He died about 3 December 1352.

Citations

References

 

Bishops of Carlisle
Year of birth missing
1352 deaths
14th-century English Roman Catholic bishops